Fritz Betzelbacher (born 18 October 1938) is a German former professional motocross racer. Born in Neu-Isenburg, Germany, he is notable for winning the 1957 250cc European Motocross Championship aboard a Maico motorcycle.

References

External links
 

Living people
1938 births
German motocross riders
People from Neu-Isenburg
Sportspeople from Darmstadt (region)